Burleigh Brae and Webster Boathouse are a historic summerhouse and boathouse in Holderness, New Hampshire.  Located near Carns Cove off New Hampshire Route 113, Burleigh Brae is part of an extensive estate owned by the locally prominent Webster family.  It was designed by Chapman & Foster and was built in 1911 for Edwin G. Webster.  The boathouse, located on the shore of Squam Lake, was built  1913.

The buildings were listed on the National Register of Historic Places in 2012.

See also
Webster Estate
National Register of Historic Places listings in Grafton County, New Hampshire

References

Further reading

Houses on the National Register of Historic Places in New Hampshire
Houses completed in 1911
Houses in Grafton County, New Hampshire
National Register of Historic Places in Grafton County, New Hampshire
Holderness, New Hampshire
Squam Lake